Supercritical fluid chromatography (SFC) is a form of normal phase chromatography that uses a supercritical fluid such as carbon dioxide as the mobile phase. It is used for the analysis and purification of low to moderate molecular weight, thermally labile molecules and can also be used for the separation of chiral compounds. Principles are similar to those of high performance liquid chromatography (HPLC), however SFC typically utilizes carbon dioxide as the mobile phase; therefore the entire chromatographic flow path must be pressurized.  Because the supercritical phase represents a state in which liquid and gas properties converge, supercritical fluid chromatography is sometimes called convergence chromatography.

Applications
SFC is used in industry primarily for separation of chiral molecules, and uses the same columns as standard HPLC systems. SFC is now commonly used for achiral separations and purifications in the pharmaceutical industry.

Apparatus
SFC with CO2 utilizes carbon dioxide pumps that require that the incoming CO2 and pump heads be kept cold in order to maintain the carbon dioxide at a temperature and pressure that keeps it in a liquid state where it can be effectively metered at some specified flow rate.  The CO2 subsequently becomes supercritical post the injector and in the column oven when the temperature and pressure it is subjected to are raised above the critical point of the liquid and the supercritical state is achieved. SFC as a chromatographic process has been likened to a process having the combined properties of the power of a liquid to dissolve a matrix, with the chromatographic interactions and kinetics of a gas. The result is that you can get a lot of mass on column per injection, and still maintain a high chromatographic efficiency. Typically, gradient elution is employed in analytical SFC using a polar co-solvent such as methanol, possibly with a weak acid or base at low concentrations ~1%. The effective plate counts per analysis can be observed to exceed 500K plates per metre routinely with 5 um material. The operator uses software to set mobile phase flow rate, co-solvent composition, system back pressure and column oven temperature which must exceed 40 °C for supercritical conditions to be achieved with CO2.  In addition, SFC provides an additional control parameter - pressure - by using an automated back pressure regulator.  From an operational standpoint, SFC is as simple and robust as HPLC but fraction collection is more convenient because the primary mobile phase evaporates leaving only the analyte and a small volume of polar co-solvent.  If the outlet CO2 is captured, it can be recompressed and recycled, allowing for >90% reuse of CO2.

Similar to HPLC, SFC uses a variety of detection methods including UV/VIS, mass spectrometry, FID (unlike HPLC) and evaporative light scattering.

Sample preparation
A rule-of-thumb is that any molecule that will dissolve in methanol or a less polar solvent is compatible with SFC, including polar solutes.  CO2 has polarity similar to n-heptane  at its critical point, but the solvent strength can be increased by increasing density or using a polar cosolvent.  In practice, when the fraction of cosolvent is high, the mobile phase is not truly supercritical, but this terminology is used regardless.
This process can be sped up by using supercritical fluid.

Mobile phase
The mobile phase is composed primarily of supercritical carbon dioxide, but since CO2 on its own is too non-polar to effectively elute many analytes, cosolvents are added to modify the mobile phase polarity.  Cosolvents are typically simple alcohols like methanol, ethanol, or isopropyl alcohol.  Other solvents such as acetonitrile, chloroform, or ethyl acetate can be used as modifiers.  For food-grade materials, the selected cosolvent is often ethanol or ethyl acetate, both of which are generally recognized as safe (GRAS).  The solvent limitations are system and column based.

Drawbacks
There have been a few technical issues that have limited adoption of SFC technology, first of which is the high pressure operating conditions.  High-pressure vessels are expensive and bulky, and special materials are often needed to avoid dissolving gaskets and O-rings in the supercritical fluid.  A second drawback is difficulty in maintaining pressure (backpressure regulation).  Whereas liquids are nearly incompressible, so their densities are constant regardless of pressure, supercritical fluids are highly compressible and their physical properties change with pressure - such as the pressure drop across a packed-bed column.  Currently, automated backpressure regulators can maintain a constant pressure in the column even if flow rate varies, mitigating this problem.  A third drawback is difficulty in gas/liquid separation during collection of product.  Upon depressurization, the CO2 rapidly turns into gas and aerosolizes any dissolved analyte in the process.  Cyclone separators have lessened difficulties in gas/liquid separations.

References

Chromatography